Scaphiodontophis venustissimus, commonly known as the common neckband snake, is a snake of the colubrid family.

Geographic distribution
The snake is found in Colombia, Costa Rica, Honduras, Nicaragua, Panama.

References

Scaphiodontophis
Snakes of Central America
Reptiles of Colombia
Reptiles of Costa Rica
Reptiles of Honduras
Reptiles of Nicaragua
Reptiles of Panama
Reptiles described in 1893
Taxa named by Albert Günther